James Leavey (born 1947) is a British writer who works especially for the tobacco industry.

Leavey's appearance on the BBC Horizon programme 'We love cigarettes' attracted criticism. Leavey also wrote The Harrods Pocket Guide to Fine Cigars. He writes regularly for Cigar Journal and other magazines. He is the author of the FOREST Guide to Smoking in London and the FOREST Guide to Smoking in Scotland: Where To Light Up.

References 

1947 births
Living people
British male journalists